Elizabeth Gould collaborates with Edward Lear in illustrating A Monograph of the Ramphastidae
1834-1835 Charles Coxen travels through the sparsely settled country between the Hunter and Namoi Rivers, including the Liverpool Plains, collecting specimens of birds and mammals.
Permanent human settlement on Lord Howe Island begins the extinction of  the Lord Howe swamphen or white gallinule, white-throated pigeon, red-crowned parakeet and the Tasman booby.
Franz Meyen describes  species then new to science such as the Humboldt penguin and the mountain caracara
Thomas Nuttall publishes Volume 2 (and last) of Manual of the Ornithology of the United States and of Canada (1832 and 1834)
Constantin Wilhelm Lambert Gloger publishes Vollständiges Handbuch der Naturgeschichte der Vögel Europas
Edward Smith-Stanley, 13th Earl of Derby withdraws from politics to concentrate on birds.
Pink-footed goose described by Louis Antoine François Baillon in  Mémoires de la Société Royale d'Émulation d'Abbeville
Ongoing Events
John James Audubon Birds of America
New bird species described in this work in 1834 include Lincoln's sparrow, the king rail,  Swainson's warbler and the Carolina chickadee

Birding and ornithology by year
1834 in science